Igor Eduardovich Shavlak (born September 12, 1962) is a  Soviet and Russian film actor, film director, screenwriter and producer.

Biography 
Igor Shavlak was born on September 12, 1962.

In 1983 he graduated from the Boris Shchukin Theatre Institute (Yuri Katin-Yartsev's workshop).

In 1986-1988, together with fellow student Aleksei Sevastyanov, he headed the Sokolniki Theater Studio, which was located in the Rusakov Workers' Club. The popularity of Igor Shavlak was brought about by roles in Russian action films and crime dramas.

In 2007 he shot the horror film Trackman. The film did not pay off at the box office, which is why Shavlak had problems with creditors. Unable to pay off their debts, the director disappeared without a trace, presumably leaving Russia. His whereabouts are currently unknown.

Selected filmography

Actor 
 1985 — Train Off Schedule  as Vlad (voiced by Oleg Menshikov)
 1985 — The Black Arrow  as Richard Shelton
 1987 — Remember Me Like This  as sailor (TV)
 1990 — The Family of the Vourdalaks  as journalist
 1993 — Breakfast with a View to the Elbrus Mountains  as Slava
 2007 — Trackman  as colonel

Film director
 1990 — The Family of the Vourdalaks  
 1997 — Hunting Season  
 2007 — Trackman

References

External links
 
 Igor Shavlak on KinoPoisk 

1962 births
Living people
Soviet male film actors
Russian male film actors
Soviet male television actors
Russian male television actors
Russian film directors
Russian screenwriters
Russian film producers
Horror film directors